is a place name used in or near Tokachi Subprefecture, Hokkaidō. It may also refer to:

 Tokachi District, Hokkaido, in Tokachi Subprefecture
 Tokachi Province (1869–1882), an old province of Hokkaidō
 Tokachi Plain, a plain in eastern Hokkaidō
 Mount Tokachi (Daisetsuzan), a volcano in central Hokkaidō
 Mount Tokachi (Hidaka), a mountain in the Hidaka Mountains of eastern Hokkaidō
 Super Tokachi, a train service in Hokkaidō

People 
 Tokachi Tsuchiya (born 1973), Japanese cinematographer